Boulenophrys tuberogranulata is a species of frog in the family Megophryidae. Its type locality is Tianzishan Nature Reserve, Sangzhi County, Hunan Province, China.

References

tuberogranulata
Amphibians described in 2010